Vincent 'Shin' O'Connor (born 1957 in Killarney, County Kerry, Ireland) is an Irish former sportsperson. He played Gaelic football with his local club Dingle and was a member of the Kerry senior inter-county team from 1977 until 1984. He was a selector under Páidí Ó Sé during his time a Clare manager.

References

External links
 http://hoganstand.com/clare/ArticleForm.aspx?ID=71340

1957 births
Living people
Dingle Gaelic footballers
Kerry inter-county Gaelic footballers
Winners of one All-Ireland medal (Gaelic football)